Weeraratne is a Sri Lankan surname. Notable people with the surname include:

Chandula Weeraratne (born 1995), Sri Lankan cricketer
Iraj Weeraratne (born 1981), Sri Lankan rapper and songwriter
Kaushalya Weeraratne (born 1981), Sri Lankan cricketer
Sangeetha Weeraratne (born 1973), Sri Lankan actress 

Sinhalese surnames